Betty Roodish Goodwin,  (March 19, 1923 – December 1, 2008) was a multidisciplinary Canadian artist who expressed the complexity of human experience through her work.

Early life 
Goodwin was born in Montreal, the only child of Romanian immigrants Clare Edith and Abraham Roodish. She enjoyed painting and drawing as a child, and was encouraged by her mother to pursue art. Goodwin's father, a factory owner in Montreal, died when she was nine. After graduating from high school, she studied design at Valentine's Commercial School of Art in Montreal.

Career
In her work, Goodwin used a variety of media, including collage, sculpture, printmaking, painting and drawing, assemblage and etchings. Her subject matter almost always revolves around the human form and deals with it in a highly emotional way. Many of her ideas came from clusters of photographs, objects or drawings on the walls in her studio. She also used the "germ" of ideas that are left after being erased from a work. Goodwin launched her career as a painter and printmaker in the late 1940s. During the 1950s and 60s Goodwin created still life paintings. She also depicted scenes of Montreal's Jewish Community.

In 1968, she enrolled in an etching class with Yves Gaucher at Sir George Williams University in Montreal. It was there where she began working with found objects and clothing and how they held traces of life, in her prints, which brought her international attention. Dissatisfied with her work, she destroyed most of it and in 1968 she limited herself to drawing. From 1972 to 1974, she created a series of wall hangings entitled Tarpaulin , which she reworked to shape into sculptures and collages.

Over a period of six years beginning in 1982, Goodwin explored the human form in her drawing series Swimmers, a project which used graphite, oil pastels and charcoal on translucent Mylar. The large-scale drawings depict solitary floating or sinking bodies, suspended in space. In 1986, to show the interaction of human figures she created her series Carbon using charcoal and wax for her drawings. Two more series followed: La mémoire du corps (1990–1995) and Nerves (1993–1995).

She died in December 2008 in Montreal.

Personal
She was married to Martin Goodwin, a civil engineer (d. 2008). Their son Paul died at 30 of a drug overdose.

Selected exhibitions
Solo exhibitions
1976 - Betty Goodwin 1969-76, Musee d'art contemporian, Montreal, Quebec
1996 - Betty Goodwin: Signs of Life, National Gallery of Canada, Ottawa
1998 - The Art of Betty Goodwin, Art Gallery of Ontario, Toronto
2002 - The Prints of Betty Goodwin, National Gallery of Canada, Ottawa

Group exhibitions
1955 - Print Exhibition, Montreal Museum of Fine Arts, Quebec
1967 - Burnaby Print Show, Burnaby Art Gallery, Burnaby, BC
1974 - Spanish International Biennial Exhibition of Fine Prints, Segovia, Spain
1986 - Installations-Fictions, Galerie Graff, Montreal, Quebec
1991 - Betty Goodwin, Espacc la Tranchefile, Montreal
1993 - Fawbush Gallery; New York, New York; Les Femmeuses 92, Pratt et Whitney Canada, Montreal, Quebec
1994 - La Ferme Du Buisson, Centre d'art contemporian, Noisiel, France
1996 - Stephen Friedman Gallery, London 
1999 - Cosmos, Montreal Museum of Fine Arts, Quebec
2000 - Odd Bodies, Oakville Galleries, Oakville, Ontario; Betty Goodwin, Jack Shainman Gallery, New York, New York

Notable artworks
 1979: Rue Mentana
 1985: Moving Towards Fire
 1988-89: Steel Note

Selected collections
Her work is represented in many public collections, including the Art Gallery of Ontario, the National Gallery of Canada, the Musée d'art contemporain de Montréal, the Montreal Museum of Fine Arts, the city of Burnaby art collection, and the Winnipeg Art Gallery.

Honours
 Victor Martyn Lynch-Staunton Award of the Canada Council for the Arts (1981)
 Banff Centre National Award for Visual Arts (1984)
 Prix Paul-Émile Borduas (1986)
 Guggenheim Foundation Fellowship (1988)
 Gershon Iskowitz Prize (1995)
 Harold Town Prize in drawing (1998)
 Governor General’s Award in Visual and Media Arts (2003)
 Order of Canada (2003)
 Royal Canadian Academy of Arts
 honorary doctorates from schools across Canada

References

Further reading
 Bogardi, Georges. "The Studio: In her reconfigurations of ideas and found materials, Betty Goodwin transforms life into art." Canadian Art Vol. 11, no. 3 (Fall 1994): 86–93.
 Bradley, Jessica and Matthew Teitelbaum, eds. The Art of Betty Goodwin. Vancouver: Douglas & McIntyre, 1998. 
 Driedger, Sharon Doyle. "Bodies and Blood: Betty Goodwin depicts profound inner landscapes". Maclean's Vol. 108, no. 49 (Dec. 4, 1995): 74.
 Enright, Robert. "A Bloodstream of Images: an interview with Betty Goodwin." Border Crossings Vol. 14, no. 4 (Fall 1995): 42–53.
 Goodwin, Betty. Betty Goodwin: Passages. Montreal: Concordia Art Gallery, 1986. 
 Kirshner, Sheldon. "Betty Goodwin: Canada's Grande Dame of Art." The Canadian Jewish News Vol. 29, no. 2 (Jan. 14, 1999): 11.
 Morin, France and Sanford Kwinter. Steel Notes, Betty Goodwin. Ottawa: National Gallery of Canada, 1989. 
 The Art of Betty Goodwin. Ed. by Jessica Bradley and Matthew Teitelbaum. Art Gallery of Ontario, Toronto, 1998. Published in association with Douglas & McIntyre, Vancouver. 192 pp. with 91 ills. (46 col.). 29 x 25 cm. LC 99-488135  In English.
 Betty Goodwin. Musee d'art Contemporain, Montreal, 1976. 32 pp. 28 x 22 cm. In French. Artist(s):Goodwin, Betty
 Betty Goodwin: Oeuvres De 1971 A 1987/Works from 1971 TO 1987. Yolande Racine. Art Gallery of Ontario, Toronto, 1987. Organized and published by Montreal Museum of Fine Arts. 252 pp. (2 foldout) with 129 ills. (56 col.). 27 x 23 cm.  Bilingual in French and English.
 Betty Goodwin: Parcours De L'oeuvre A Tracers La Collection Du Musee D'art Contemporain De Montreal (Betty Goodwin: Survey of the Oeuvre through the Collection of the Musee d'art contemporain, Montreal). Josee Belisle. Musee d'art contemporain, Montreal, 2009. 116 pp. with 54 col. ills. 25 x 20 cm.  Bilingual in French and English (biographical notes and brief entries in French only).
 Betty Goodwin: Steel Notes. France Morin et al. Canadian Section, 20a. Bienal Internacional de São Paulo, 1989. Organized and published by National Gallery of Canada, Ottawa. Distributed by University of Toronto Press. 152 pp. with 55 ills. (29 col.). 25 x 20 cm.  Trilingual in Portuguese, English and French. 
 The Prints of Betty Goodwin. Rosemarie L. Tovell et al. National Gallery of Canada, Ottawa, 2002. Published in association with Douglas & McIntyre, Vancouver. 248 pp. with 251 ills. (36 col.). 28 x 23 cm. LC 2002-483164  In English.

External links
 Betty Goodwin archival papers (SC 124) held at the Art Gallery of Ontario research library and archives
 Mundane Secrets: reflecting on the artist Betty Goodwin 2009 ArtsEditor.com article
 Betty Goodwin, Artist of Mourning
 images of Goodwin's art on Artnet
 Betty Roodish Goodwin at The Canadian Encyclopedia

1923 births
2008 deaths
20th-century Canadian painters
21st-century Canadian painters
20th-century Canadian sculptors
21st-century Canadian sculptors
Anglophone Quebec people
Artists from Montreal
Canadian installation artists
Canadian people of Romanian descent
20th-century Canadian printmakers
Canadian women painters
Canadian women sculptors
Governor General's Award in Visual and Media Arts winners
Officers of the Order of Canada
Sir George Williams University alumni
Members of the Royal Canadian Academy of Arts
Sculptors from Quebec
20th-century Canadian women artists
21st-century Canadian women artists
Women printmakers
20th-century printmakers